Alexsandro do Nascimento de Melo (born 26 September 1995) is a Brazilian long jumper.

He won a bronze medal in the 2018 South American Games at long jump, a bronze medal in the 2019 Summer Universiade at triple jump, and finished 4th in the 2019 Pan American Games in long jump.

He qualified to represent Brazil at the 2020 Summer Olympics.

Personal bests
Long Jump: 8.19 (wind: +1.9 m/s) –  Bragança Paulista, 16 Sep 2018
Triple Jump: 17.31 (wind: +0.4 m/s) –  Cochabamba, 24 Apr 2019
100 m: 10.57 (wind: -0.3 m/s) –  São Paulo, 15 Feb 2017

Competition record

References

External links

Living people
1995 births
Brazilian male long jumpers
World Athletics Championships athletes for Brazil
Pan American Games athletes for Brazil
Athletes (track and field) at the 2015 Pan American Games
Athletes (track and field) at the 2019 Pan American Games
South American Games bronze medalists for Brazil
South American Games medalists in athletics
Athletes (track and field) at the 2018 South American Games
Universiade bronze medalists for Brazil
Universiade medalists in athletics (track and field)
Medalists at the 2019 Summer Universiade
Troféu Brasil de Atletismo winners
Athletes (track and field) at the 2020 Summer Olympics
Sportspeople from Londrina
Olympic athletes of Brazil
South American Championships in Athletics winners
21st-century Brazilian people
20th-century Brazilian people